Ahmad Maher Pasha (1888 – 24 February 1945) was an Egyptian politician from the Saadist Institutional Party who served as Prime Minister of Egypt from October 1944 to February 1945. 

Maher Pasha was Minister of Finance in 1938. He was the prime minister from 10 October 1944 to 24 February 1945. He was appointed the removal of Mustafa an-Nahhas Pasha by King Farouk of Egypt.

After assuming power, he called for new elections and opposed the candidacies of members of the Muslim Brotherhood against whom he had declared a fatwa. Maher then declared war against the Axis Powers in World War II, primarily to gain a diplomatic advantage at the end of the war, which was seen as imminent. Immediately after his announcement, Maher was assassinated at Parliament by the 28-year-old Mahmoud El Essawy. It is assumed that Essawy was a member of the Muslim Brotherhood.

Maher Pasha married his first cousin Ihsan Hanem Sami, whose family was part of the European aristocracy, which dominated the socio-economic scene, 

He was said to be a Freemason, and he was the grandfather of Ahmad Maher, foreign minister from 2001 to 2004, as well as Ambassador Ali Maher.

References

"Egyptian Premier Slain in Chamber". The New York Times, 25 February 1945.

1888 births
1945 deaths
20th-century prime ministers of Egypt
Assassinated Egyptian politicians
Assassinated heads of government
Assassinated heads of state
People murdered in Egypt
Prime Ministers of Egypt
Finance Ministers of Egypt
Wafd Party politicians
Egyptian pashas
1945 murders in Egypt